XHRKS-FM (103.3 MHz) is a Spanish-language radio station that serves the McAllen, Texas (USA) / Reynosa, Tamaulipas (Mexico) border area.

History
XEJN-AM 940 received its concession on August 8, 1953. It was owned by Radio Televisora de Reynosa, S.A. until 1993. The station burned down in a 1962 fire; its facilities were a total loss. After the fire, the call letters were changed to XERKS.

In April 2018, XERKS began its AM-FM migration by signing on XHRKS-FM 103.3. XERKS-AM shut down in December 2020.

As of July 1, 2021, XHRKS changed its format from Romantica to make way for La Poderosa.

References

External links
 
 

Spanish-language radio stations
Radio stations in Reynosa
1953 establishments in Mexico
Radio stations established in 1953